Durham College was a college of the University of Oxford, founded by the monks of Durham Priory in the late 13th century. It was closed at the dissolution of the monasteries in the mid 16th century, and its buildings were subsequently used to found Trinity College, Oxford.

History

Establishment 

The college was built to provide a place of learning for Benedictine monks from the monastery in Durham. Until the 1280s, there had been no Benedictine establishment in Oxford itself, and, while in 1291 the southern abbeys decided to combine their efforts at Gloucester College, Durham had already begun to make its own arrangements.

The site was acquired by the abbey in 1286 or 1291 and the college, which would house six to ten monks, developed over the coming decades. A prior oversaw the development of the college, which included the construction of an oratory in 1323 and groundwork for a chapel shortly thereafter, though no such chapel was actually built. 

The college was a cell of Durham Priory, and the monks who lived there were monks of Durham, residing in Oxford at the discretion of the Prior of Durham, while the priors were appointed centrally, as with other cells such as Finchale Priory.

In 1338, Richard de Bury (or Aungerville), Bishop of Durham and noted bibliophile, attempted to secure the future of the college by persuading King Edward III to assign the proceeds of the profitable rectory of Simonburn to the nascent college, which he also intended to establish with new statutes dedicating it to God and St Margaret, and equip with his famed library of over 1,500 volumes. However, the surviving college rolls suggest that no part of this took place, and Simonburn was given instead to the Canons of St George's Windsor, while the college did not gain a library until 70 years after de Bury's death.

Hatfield's endowment 

In 1380, Thomas Hatfield, Bishop of Durham, drew up a covenant to leave a £3000 legacy to provide £200 annually for the maintenance of eight student monks (socii or fellows) and eight seculars (scholares or scholars). Execution of the scheme was delayed after Hatfield's death in 1381, but the funds were eventually delivered, and used by the Priory to purchase a number of rectories - Frampton, Fishlake, Bossall and Ruddington - to provide income for the college.

The statutes drawn up stated that the fellows were to take instruction in philosophy and theology; they were also to oversee the selection of the scholars, four of whom were to be drawn from North Yorkshire and four from the Diocese of Durham. Once selected, the eight scholars would learn philosophy and grammar, whilst being paid to assist the monks in unspecified day-to-day tasks. All students were expected to remain for seven or eight years to complete their instruction. The running of the College would be overseen by one of the fellows, who was to take the title of Warden.

The funds proved sufficient for the laying out of a quadrangle around which various buildings were constructed, including living quarters, a refectory, a chapel (1408–9) and a library (1417–8).

The college also seems to have acted as a home for students from other Northern Benedictine abbeys, including York and Whitby. Rooms also seem to have been rented to others who were not part of the foundation, including university chancellor Gilbert Kymer, whose acts during his second period as chancellor (1446-53) were dated from Durham College.

Disestablishment
During the English reformation the site was surrendered twice to the crown. The first time, in 1540, it was reported to have an annual income of £115. Around this time, the buildings on the site were inspected by a surveyor from the Court of Augmentations, providing valuable details about the buildings and the grounds, which were said to consist of three well-proportioned gardens.

The buildings of the college were regranted to the Dean of Durham, who kept it on in much the same form, with a rector, six fellows, and four 'inferior fellows'. George Clyff, the senior fellow of the college, was appointed as rector, but does not seem to have taken his responsibilities seriously, and the college did not survive.

In 1541, Henry VIII proposed founding a university in Durham using the funds of the College, but the plans were scaled down to a grammar school, with a headmaster and assistant master paid from Cathedral funds.

The College buildings were again surrendered to the crown in March 1544/5 and not regranted, while its estates reverted to the Dean and Chapter of Durham. The buildings were briefly occupied as a private hall by Walter Wright, Archdeacon of Oxford and later Vice-Chancellor of the university, but they then fell into disrepair, and are described colourfully by Anthony Wood as "canilia lustra" (dog kennels).

In 1546, half of the college's grove, having been leased to St Bernard's College, Oxford, for some time, was granted along with St Bernard's to Christ Church. The garden would eventually become part of the original site of St John's College, Oxford, upon its foundation in 1555. On 20 February 1554/5 the remainder of the site, having been redistributed in 1553 to private owners (Dr George Owen of Godstow and William Martyn of Oxford) was sold to self-made politician Thomas Pope, who used them to found Trinity College 16 days later. Durham College was originally dedicated to the Virgin Mary, St Cuthbert, and the Trinity, and it is thought that Trinity College took its name from the last element of this dedication.

Legacy

The college's name is preserved in the Durham Quadrangle of Trinity College. The east range of the Durham College quadrangle largely survives, including 15th century stained glass in the Old Library on the first floor. Elements of 14th century fabric also survive on the opposite side of the quad, at either end of the 17th-century hall, with some 15th and 16th century stained glass.

On its foundation in 1832, the University of Durham positioned itself as the successor of Durham College. Charles Thorp, first warden of Durham University, wrote:

Early Durham University calendars contained a note setting out the link between the college and the university, and the university's coat of arms includes on a canton that of Bishop Hatfield, who endowed Durham College.

Priors (later Wardens)
Drawn from the Oxford Historical Society's Collectanea.
 Gilbert Elwyk, S.T.P., occurs 1316
 John de Beverlaco, S.T.P., occurs 1333
 R— de C—, after 1340
 ? Uthred de Boldon, S.T.P., 1360
 ? John Aclyff, or de Acley, 1380
 Robert Blaklaw, 1389–1404
 William Appylby, 1404–1409
 Thomas Rome, S.T.P., 1409–1419
 William Ebchester, S.T.P., 1419–1428
 Richard Barton, S.T.B., 1428–1431
 John Mody, S.T.P., 1431–1440
 John Burnby, S.T.P., 1442–1450
 Richard Bell, S.T.B., 1450–1453
 John Burnby, again, 1453–1456
 Thomas Caly, S.T.B., 1457–1463
 Robert Ebchester, S.T.P., c. 1464–1475
 William Law, S.T.B., c. 1478–1481
 John Aukland, S.T.P., c. 1481–1484
 Thomas Rowland, S.T.B., 1484–1487
 Thomas Castell, S.T.P., 1487–1494
 William Cawthorne, S.T.P., 1494–1501
 Thomas Swalwell, S.T.P., 1501
 ? Thomas Castell, occurs 1511
 Hugh Whitehead, S.T.P., 1512–1519
 Edward Hyndmer alias Henmarsh, S.T.P., 1527–1541
 George Clyff, S.T.B., 1541–1542

References

Bibliography
 
 
 
 
 

History of Durham, England
Former colleges and halls of the University of Oxford
1291 establishments in England
1545 disestablishments in England
1540s disestablishments in England